Australian Tour 2013 (also known as the Triumphant Tour or Triumphant Australian Tour among fans) was an Australian concert tour by American singer-songwriter Mariah Carey.

Background 
After the birth of Carey's twins, Moroccan and Mornoe Cannon, with then-husband Nick Cannon in 2011, Carey decided to take a break from music and spend the next two years focused on other projects, such as being the spokesperson for American weight loss company Jenny Craig and creating a second capsule collection for HSN. In 2012, inspired by the death of fellow singer Whitney Houston and Cannon's hospitalization due to kidney failure, Carey made her grand return to music with "Triumphant (Get 'Em)", featuring American rappers Rick Ross and Meek Mill, originally released as the lead single from her 14th studio album, Me. I Am Mariah... The Elusive Chanteuse, at the time titled The Art of Letting Go. However, negative reviews and low sales reflected on the song not being included in Carey's next effort and the song received very little promotion, as it was then considered as a mere buzz single before the release of "#Beautiful", the actual lead single of Carey's next album.

Still part of Carey's return to music, the singer embarked on a 3 date tour across Australia, a region she hadn't visited since 1998's Butterfly World Tour. With shows on the Gold Coast, Sydney and Melbourne, the tour received positive reviews among the press and fans of the singer.

Set list 
The following set list is obtained from the January 3, 2013 show in Sydney. It is not intended to represent all dates throughout the tour.
 "Can't Take That Away (Mariah's Theme)" (Triumphant Revival Remix)
 "Touch My Body"
 "Shake It Off"
 "My All" (outro contains elements of the Classic Club Mix)
 "Emotions"
 "Always Be My Baby"
 "I'll Be There" (with Trey Lorenz)
 "Rock with You" / "Let's Go Crazy" (Interlude) (performed by Trey Lorenz)
 "Obsessed"
 "Can't Let Go" / "Love Takes Time"
"Don't Forget About Us"
 "It's Like That" (With elements of "Hollis Crew" and "Sucker M.C.'s" by Run-DMC)
 "Close My Eyes" 
 "Hero"
"Hero" 
Encore
"We Belong Together" (outro contains elements of the Desert Storm Remix)

Shows

References 

2013 concert tours